This is a list of princesses of Serbia, that is, daughter of Serbian monarchs. It does not include princesses of Yugoslavia.

Middle Ages

Modern

Principality of Serbia

Kingdom of Serbia

See also
List of Serbian monarchs
List of Serbian consorts

References

Sources

 
 
 
 
 
 

List
Serbia
Princesses
Princesses